Giacomo Giustiniani (1769–1843) was an Italian priest, papal diplomat and Cardinal. Considered papabile in the Papal Conclave (1830–31), his election was vetoed by Ferdinand VII of Spain.

He was the younger brother of Vincenzo Giustiniani, 6th Prince Giustiniani, de jure 6th Earl of Newburgh.

His ecclesiastical career and preparation for the priesthood was interrupted by the Napoleonic Wars, and he was ordained in 1816. In 1817 he was papal nuncio in Spain and became titular archbishop of Tyre. He became bishop of Imola in 1826.

He was created Cardinal by Pope Leo XII in 1826. He became bishop of Albano in 1839 and he became Camerlengo in 1837.

Notes

External links
Catholic Hierarchy page 
Biography

1769 births
1843 deaths
19th-century Italian cardinals
Cardinal-bishops of Albano
Bishops of Imola
Diplomats of the Holy See
19th-century Italian Roman Catholic bishops
Camerlengos of the Holy Roman Church